Brookhaven-Comsewogue Union School District (pronounced Kom-sah-wohg) is located in Port Jefferson Station, on the North Shore of Long Island, in Brookhaven Town, Suffolk County, New York, United States.

The district office is attached to Norwood Ave. Elementary School.  Richard T. Brande retired as Superintendent after the 2005-06 school year and was replaced by deputy superintendent Shelley Saffer.  The deputy superintendent was former Comsewogue High School principal, Dr. Joseph Rella until 2010, when Shelley Saffer retired and Joseph Rella became Superintendent. Former Comsewogue High School principal, Jennifer Reph, then became deputy superintendent.

Comsewogue comes from a language used by the Setalcott or Setauket Indians who were native to the area. It means place where several paths comes together.

Schools

Elementary school (K-2;3-5) 
K-2
 Norwood Elementary School (Opened 1965), Became a K-2 school in the 2012-2013 year
 Clinton Avenue Elementary School (Opened 1968), Became a K-2 school in the 2012-2013 year

3-5
 Terryville Road Elementary School (Opened 1962), Became a 3-5 school in the 2012-2013 year
 Boyle Road Elementary School (Opened 1971), Became a 3-5 school in the 2012-2013 year

Other
 Comsewogue Elementary School (Opened 1921) Closed

Middle school (6-8)
 John F. Kennedy Middle School (Opened in 1965 as a Junior-Senior High School, with grades 6 through 9, adding grades 10, then 11 and 12, each in the three subsequent years, 1966-1968). Grades 7 and 8 beginning fall 1971. Grades 6, 7 and 8 beginning fall 1988.

High School (9-12)
 Comsewogue High School (Opened in 1971)

Comsewogue Sports
Baseball - Suffolk County Champions (1970), State Champions (1982)

Softball  - State Champions (1984)

Adam Mariano - Wrestling State Champion (1988, 1989)

Men's Lacrosse State Champions (1998, 2002)

Men's Soccer State Champions (2008, 2009)

2008
Boys Varsity Soccer, Suffolk County Class A Champion, New York State Class A Champion

2009
 Boys Varsity Soccer, Suffolk County Class A Champion, Long Island Champion, State Champions

Alumni

Clinton Kelly from TLC's What Not to Wear.
Bill Klein from TLC’s The Little Couple
Tim Cummings
Kevin Cassese (lacrosse player)
Cpl. Steven J. Crowley (Marine guard killed in the 1979 terror attack on the U.S. Embassy in Islamabad)
James K. Lyons (film editor, screenwriter and actor)
R.A. the Rugged Man (hip-hop artist and filmmaker)
Nick Mamatas (author)
Nick Kiriazis (actor)

References

External links
 http://www.comsewogue.k12.ny.us/

Education in Suffolk County, New York
School districts in New York (state)
School districts established in 1874
1874 establishments in New York (state)